Norbert Hurt (born 16 April 1983) is an Estonian football coach. He is currently an assistant manager of Flora.

Playing career
Hurt started playing football with the Merkuur in Tartu and continued with the Tammeka Football Academy. In 2012, he joined II liiga club HÜJK Emmaste. In the following year, Emmaste was promoted to the newly established Esiliiga B division. Hurt left Emmaste in 2014 to pursue his coaching career.

Managerial career
In 2009, Tammeka hired Hurt as manager for the 2009 season. Since 2011, Hurt coached Flora's reserve team Flora II. On 20 July 2013, he replaced the sacked Flora manager Marko Lelov as caretaker manager, with position being made permanent later. Flora finished the 2013 season in fourth place and placed third in 2014.

In 2015, as Flora celebrated their 25th anniversary as a club, Hurt coached the team to their 10th Meistriliiga trophy, securing the league title in the 34th round of the season.

On 8 July 2016, Hurt resigned after Flora failed to advance past the first qualifying round of the 2016–17 UEFA Champions League, losing to Lincoln Red Imps 2–3 on aggregate.

In February 2018, he became the head coach of Estonia U16 national team.

Honours

Managerial
Flora
 Meistriliiga: 2015
 Estonian Supercup: 2014, 2016

References

External links

1983 births
Living people
Estonian footballers
FC Flora managers
Sportspeople from Tartu
Association football midfielders
Estonian football managers
JK Maag Tartu players